The women's doubles tournament of the 2022 BWF World Championships took place from 22 to 28 August 2022 at the Tokyo Metropolitan Gymnasium in Tokyo.

Seeds

The seeding list was based on the World Rankings of 9 August 2022.

  Chen Qingchen / Jia Yifan (champions)
  Yuki Fukushima / Sayaka Hirota (withdrew)
  Lee So-hee / Shin Seung-chan (quarter-finals)
  Kim So-yeong / Kong Hee-yong (final)
  Nami Matsuyama / Chiharu Shida (quarter-finals)
  Mayu Matsumoto / Wakana Nagahara (semi-finals)
  Jongkolphan Kititharakul / Rawinda Prajongjai (quarter-finals)
  Gabriela Stoeva / Stefani Stoeva (third round)

  Jeong Na-eun / Kim Hye-jeong (third round)
  Pearly Tan / Thinaah Muralitharan (third round)
  Zhang Shuxian / Zheng Yu (quarter-finals)
  Maiken Fruergaard / Sara Thygesen (third round)
  Du Yue / Li Wenmei (third round)
  Puttita Supajirakul / Sapsiree Taerattanachai (semi-finals)
  Rin Iwanaga / Kie Nakanishi (third round)
  Rachel Honderich / Kristen Tsai (withdrew)

Draw

Finals

Top half

Section 1

Section 2

Bottom half

Section 3

Section 4

References 

2022 BWF World Championships
Women in Tokyo